The  is a DC electric multiple unit (EMU) train type operated by West Japan Railway Company (JR-West). It was introduced on September 4, 1994, for passengers travelling to/from Kansai International Airport. Provisions are made for luggage racks and dedicated luggage room.

Design
Built jointly by Kinki Sharyo and Kawasaki Heavy Industries, the trains are used on the Haruka limited express service via the Kansai Airport Line in three- or six-car formations.

Formations
Sets are based at Hineno Depot, and are formed as shown below.

6-car sets

3-car sets

Interior

References

External links

 jr-odekake.net "Haruka 281 series" 

Electric multiple units of Japan
West Japan Railway Company
Train-related introductions in 1994
1500 V DC multiple units of Japan
Kawasaki multiple units
Kinki Sharyo multiple units